The 2017 Tennis Classic of Macon was a professional tennis tournament played on outdoor hard courts. It was the fifth edition of the tournament and was part of the 2017 ITF Women's Circuit. It took place in Macon, United States, on 23–29 October 2017.

Singles main draw entrants

Seeds 

 1 Rankings as of 16 October 2017.

Other entrants 
The following players received a wildcard into the singles main draw:
  Alona Bondarenko 
  Victoria Duval
  Nicole Gibbs
  Katerina Stewart

The following players received entry from the qualifying draw:
  Ulrikke Eikeri
  Ashley Kratzer
  Ann Li
  Ashley Weinhold

Champions

Singles

 Anna Karolína Schmiedlová def.  Victoria Duval, 6–4, 6–1

Doubles
 
 Kaitlyn Christian /  Sabrina Santamaria def.  Paula Cristina Gonçalves /  Sanaz Marand, 6–1, 6–0

External links 
 2017 Tennis Classic of Macon at ITFtennis.com
 Official website

2017 ITF Women's Circuit
2017 in American tennis
Tennis tournaments in Georgia (U.S. state)
2017 in sports in Georgia (U.S. state)